Djun djun may refer to:
a Western misnomer for dunun, a cylindrical drum of the Malinké people
Dundun, an hourglass-shaped talking drum of the Yoruba people
Junjung, a war drum of the Serer people.